Halfpenny Bridge or Ha'penny Bridge may refer to:

 Halfpenny Bridge, over the River Thames at Lechlade, Gloucester, UK
 Halfpenny Bridge, over the River Don, at Tinsley, Sheffield, UK
 Halfpenny Bridge, a pedestrian bridge over the River Avon, at Bath, Somerset, UK, which collapsed in 1877
 Ha'penny Bridge, a pedestrian bridge over the River Liffey in Dublin, Ireland
 Ha'penny Bridge, also known as South Bridge, over the River Hull in Kingston upon Hull
 Ha'penny Bridge, over the River Kelvin in Glasgow, Scotland
The Ha'Penny Bridge, Dublin is a print of the Ha'penny Bridge in Dublin, by Samuel Frederick Brocas
 Wilford Toll Bridge, over the River Trent in Nottingham